The National Securities Markets Improvement Act of 1996 is an amendment to United States federal securities laws in order to promote efficiency and capital formation in the financial markets, and to amend the Investment Company Act of 1940 to promote more efficient management of mutual funds, protect investors, and provide more effective and less burdensome regulation between states and the Federal Government.  

The law made substantial changes to the competing systems of securities regulation at the state and federal level.

One of its provisions declares that any offering of a "covered security" (as defined within the act) is exempt from state registration and review. 

Covered securities include the following:

 Nationally traded securities - for example, securities listed or authorized for listing on the NYSE or included or qualified for inclusion in Nasdaq;
 Securities of a registered investment company (i.e., mutual funds); and
 Offers and sales of certain exempt securities
 
Among the covered securities are any securities offered pursuant to S.E.C. Rule 506.

In effect, the NSMIA gave the SEC exclusive jurisdiction to regulate securities firms.

In addition, NSMIA added new section 3(c)(7) of the Investment Company Act to create an alternative exclusion for investment companies that sell their securities solely to investors who are "qualified purchasers".

Section 209 of NSMIA removed a limitation on the number of "qualified purchasers" (i.e. participants) in a hedge fund, leading to large increases in total hedge fund investments. In particular, this provision led to a large increase in the number of university endowments, pension funds, and other institutional investors that participated in hedge funds.

See also
Uniform Securities Act
Uniform Securities Agent State Law Examination (Series 63)

References

Sources
National Securities Markets Improvement Act of 1996 (Enrolled as Agreed to or Passed by Both House and Senate) [H.R.3005.ENR] 

United States federal securities legislation
United States federal legislation articles without infoboxes